1633 Chimay, provisional designation , is a Themistian asteroid from the outer region of the asteroid belt, approximately 37 kilometers in diameter.

It was discovered on 3 March 1929, by Belgian astronomer Sylvain Arend at the Royal Observatory of Belgium in Uccle. Five nights later, the body was independently discovered by Max Wolf at Heidelberg Observatory in southern Germany. It was later named for the Belgian town of Chimay.

Classification and orbit 

Chimay is a member of the Themis family, a dynamical family of asteroids with nearly coplanar ecliptical orbits. It orbits the Sun in the outer main-belt at a distance of 2.8–3.6 AU once every 5 years and 9 months (2,085 days). Its orbit has an eccentricity of 0.12 and an inclination of 3° with respect to the ecliptic.

Physical characteristics 

Several rotational lightcurves were obtained from photometric observations. Lightcurve analysis gave a well-defined, concurring rotation period of 6.58–6.63 hours with a brightness variation between 0.31 and 0.58 magnitude.

According to the surveys carried out by the Infrared Astronomical Satellite IRAS, the Japanese Akari satellite, and the NEOWISE mission of NASA's Wide-field Infrared Survey Explorer, Chimay measures between 36.1 and 37.7 kilometers in diameter, and its surface has a low albedo between 0.079 and 0.089. In accordance with the space-based surveys, the Collaborative Asteroid Lightcurve Link (CALL) derives an albedo of 0.078, and calculates a diameter of 36.1 kilometers. CALL also classifies Chimay as a S-type rather than a carbonaceous C-type asteroid.

Naming 

This minor planet was named after the Belgian town Chimay, home of the discoverer, who also co-discovered Comet Arend–Roland. The official  was published by the Minor Planet Center on 20 February 1976.

References

External links 
 Asteroid Lightcurve Database (LCDB), query form (info )
 Dictionary of Minor Planet Names, Google books
 Asteroids and comets rotation curves, CdR – Observatoire de Genève, Raoul Behrend
 Discovery Circumstances: Numbered Minor Planets (1)-(5000) – Minor Planet Center
 
 

001633
Discoveries by Sylvain Arend
Named minor planets
19290303